Luis G. Barreiro (1886–1947) was a Mexican film actor.

Selected filmography
 Such Is My Country (1937)
 Heads or Tails (1937)
 These Men (1937)
 Beautiful Mexico (1938)
 The Unknown Policeman (1941)
 Simón Bolívar (1942)
 Caminito alegre (1944)
 Miguel Strogoff (1944)
 Gran Hotel (1944)
 Mischievous Susana (1945)
 The Disobedient Son (1945)
 Rosalinda (1945)
 The Associate (1946)
 Symphony of Life (1946)
 The Tiger of Jalisco (1947)
 The Lost Child (1947)
 Spurs of Gold (1948)

References

Bibliography
 Rogelio Agrasánchez. Guillermo Calles: A Biography of the Actor and Mexican Cinema Pioneer. McFarland, 2010.

External links

1886 births
1947 deaths
Mexican male film actors
Mexican male silent film actors
Male actors from Mexico City